The 2009 Hard Justice was a professional wrestling pay-per-view (PPV) event produced by the Total Nonstop Action Wrestling (TNA) promotion, which took place on August 16, 2009 at the TNA Impact! Zone in Orlando, Florida. It was the fifth event under the Hard Justice chronology. Nine professional wrestling matches were featured on the event's card.

The main event saw Kurt Angle defending his TNA World Heavyweight Championship against Sting and Matt Morgan  in a 3 – way match. Kevin Nash defeated Mick Foley to win the TNA Legends Championship. Other matches featured on the card included a Falls Count Anywhere match and a singles match. In the first, The Main Event Mafia (Booker T and Scott Steiner) defeated Team 3D (Brother Ray and Brother Devon) to retain the Tag Team championships. The second was for the TNA X Division Championship, in which Samoa Joe defeated Homicide to win the championship.

The event featured the debut of D'Angelo Dinero in TNA, who had previously worked for the WWE.  The event was released on DVD on October 20, 2009 by TNA Home Video.

In October 2017, with the launch of the Global Wrestling Network, the event became available to stream on demand.

Storylines

Hard Justice featured nine professional wrestling matches that involved different wrestlers from pre-existing scripted feuds and storylines. Wrestlers were portrayed as either villains or heroes in the scripted events that built tension and culminated into a wrestling match or series of matches.

The main feud heading into Hard Justice was between Kurt Angle, Sting, and Matt Morgan over the TNA World Heavyweight Championship. On TNA's primary television  program TNA Impact! in the weeks leading to the event, Morgan competed against A.J. Styles for a spot in the main event at Hard Justice. Morgan won their contest and injured Styles in the process. Angle tried to trade Morgan a spot in The Main Event Mafia in exchange for Morgan making sure that Angle kept his title at the event. Sting had been attacked by Angle and The Main Event Mafia on Impact!, and his presence distracted Kevin Nash and Angle long enough for Mick Foley to win the TNA Legends Championship from Nash with the help of Bobby Lashley.

Another feud was between Mick Foley and Kevin Nash over the TNA Legends Championship. Foley had won the title from Nash in a tag team match with special stipulations that also involved Angle and Bobby Lashley. Foley and Nash then argued about whether wrestling was about the wrestling or the money, which heated up their emotions leading into the event.

A feud on the mid-card revolved around Rob Terry stealing Hernandez's Feast or Fired Briefcase which holds a title shot at the TNA World Heavyweight Championship. Their match at Hard Justice would be with the briefcase on the line. The final major feud heading into the event was between Abyss, Dr. Stevie, and Jethro Holliday. Dr. Stevie had offered $50,000 to anyone who could beat Abyss, and Holliday took up the offer and attacked Abyss with a steel chair while he was giving an interview on Impact!.

Reception
411mania.com writer Arnold Furious rated the event 4 out of 10 stars, which was lower than the 2008 event's rating of 7.6 out of 10 stars. The main event for the TNA World Heavyweight Championship was rated a 1.5 out of 5 stars, while the Tag Team Match for the IWGP Tag Team Championship was rated a 2.5 out of 5 stars.

Results

References

External links
Hard Justice at In Demand.com
TNA Wrestling.com

Hardcore Justice
2009 in professional wrestling in Florida
Events in Orlando, Florida
Professional wrestling in Orlando, Florida
2009 Total Nonstop Action Wrestling pay-per-view events